Tribe is the 1987 third solo album by Bernie Taupin issued by RCA Records.  The album includes the two singles, "Friend of the Flag" and "Citizen Jane". Music videos were made for both singles.

Track listing
All songs written by Bernie Taupin and Martin Page.  Two other songs written by Taupin and Page around the same time, "Backbone" and "White Boys in Chains", were used as the B-sides to the singles "Friend of the Flag" and "Citizen Jane", respectively.

 "Friend of the Flag" (4:37)
 "Corrugated Iron" (4:54)
 "Citizen Jane" (4:55)
 "Hold Back the Night" (4:46)
 "She Sends Shivers" (with Martha Davis) (4:21)
 "Billy Fury" (with Elton John) (4:44)
 "I Still Can't Believe That You're Gone" (5:15)
 "Conquistador" (4:36)
 "The New Lone Ranger" (4:59)
 "Desperation Train" (5:11)

Personnel

Tribe (the "band")
Bernie Taupin - lead vocals
Martin Page - electric and Fretless bass, drum and percussion programming, additional keyboards, vocals
Brian Fairweather - guitar, vocals
Paul Fox - keyboards
Craig Krampf - drums, additional drum programming, vocals

Additional musicians
Bruce Hornsby - piano, accordion
Larry Williams - saxophone
Hammer Smith - harmonica
Fred Mandel - keyboards
Paul Delph - keyboards, backing vocals
Martha Davis – lead vocals on "She Sends Shivers"

Additional backing vocalists
Stevie Bensusen, John Cannon, Alan Carvell, Tommy Funderburk, Elton John, Shirley Lewis, Gordon Neville, Sylvia St. James, Hamish Stuart, Margaret Taylor

Charts

References

1987 albums
RCA Records albums